Keyword Tool is a free SaaS product that uses Google Autocomplete and other search engines to generate relevant long-tail keywords and related keywords for any topic.

History
Keyword Tool was launched in the middle of 2014. and was created by Artem Galimov and Leow Kah Thong. It started with providing keywords in 83 languages from the autocomplete of 194 Google domains.
In 2015, Keyword Tool participated in StartUp Chile 13th generation program.

Services
KeywordTool helps the user to locate long-tail and related keywords. It relies on Google's autocomplete feature in giving quick access to popular search terms. It scrapes keyword suggest ideas from Google, YouTube, Bing, Amazon, eBay, Play Store, Instagram, and Twitter.

See also
 Google Search
 Google Keyword Planner
 Keyword research

References

Web software
Internet properties established in 2014